Oh Eun-seok (born 2 April 1983) is a South Korean retired sabre fencer. He is an Olympic and Asian Games gold medalist in the team event.

Early life
A native of Daegu, Oh was a former runner and took up fencing in middle school. He attended Osung High School, one of the few high schools in the city with a fencing club. It was not until he enrolled at Dong-Eui University, known for its fencing team, that he decided to turn professional.

Career
Oh won gold in team sabre and silver in individual sabre at the 2003 Junior World Fencing Championships in Trapani, Italy. He also participated in the Universiade hosted by his hometown and won silver in the individual event. In 2005 he reached the final of the Seoul Grand Prix and was defeated by his rookie national teammate Kim Jung-hwan. However, Kim's gold medal was forfeited and given to Oh after the former failed a doping test.

At the 2007 FIE World Championships he won the bronze medal in the men's individual sabre category after losing to four-time Olympic champion and ten-time world champion Stanislav Pozdnyakov of Russia 12–15 in the semifinals.

Oh qualified for the 2008 Beijing Olympics for the individual sabre competition. On August 12, 2008, he won his first round 15–8 win against Dmitri Lapkes of Belarus, but ultimately had a 15–11 loss to eventual silver medalist Nicolas Lopez of France in the round of 16. He finished 13th.

At 2012 Summer Olympics, he participated as substitute for the team sabre competition. Despite not getting his chance for participating in quarterfinal match against Germany, and semifinal match against Italy, he came out on final match against Romania on 8th bout. He faced Alexandru Sirițeanu, who came out as substitute for the Romanian side. The bout finished in just 14 seconds, when Oh accumulated 5 points for the Korean side, while conceding 1 point. Ultimately, he won gold medal along with his teammates Gu Bon-gil, Won Woo-young, and Kim Jung-hwan. The quartet continued to dominate in the team events; in the year 2014 alone they swept gold at both the Asian Championships and Asian Games hosted at home and won silver at the World Championships. They had a disappointing run at the 2015 World Championships as none of them reached the final in the individual event and then lost by only a point to France in the quarter-finals of the team event. A week later, they successfully defended their team gold medal at the Asian Championships, his last major international competition. Oh and Won both retired from the national team at the end of the season.

Medal Record

Olympic Games

World Cup

Grand Prix

Personal life
Oh married rhythmic gymnast Gim Yun-hee in May 2016. Gim is a 2014 Asian Games silver medalist in the team event.

References

External links
 Profile and Career Statistics on the International Fencing Federation website
 

1983 births
Living people
Fencers at the 2004 Summer Olympics
Fencers at the 2008 Summer Olympics
Fencers at the 2012 Summer Olympics
Olympic fencers of South Korea
Olympic gold medalists for South Korea
Olympic medalists in fencing
Asian Games medalists in fencing
Fencers at the 2006 Asian Games
Fencers at the 2010 Asian Games
Medalists at the 2012 Summer Olympics
South Korean male sabre fencers
Sportspeople from Daegu
Fencers at the 2014 Asian Games
Asian Games gold medalists for South Korea
Asian Games silver medalists for South Korea
Asian Games bronze medalists for South Korea
Medalists at the 2006 Asian Games
Medalists at the 2010 Asian Games
Medalists at the 2014 Asian Games
Universiade medalists in fencing
Universiade silver medalists for South Korea
Dong-Eui University alumni
20th-century South Korean people
21st-century South Korean people